Leptohoplia is a genus of shining leaf chafers in the family of beetles known as Scarabaeidae. There are at least two described species in Leptohoplia.

Species
These two species belong to the genus Leptohoplia:
 Leptohoplia carlsoni (Hardy, 1976) c g
 Leptohoplia testaceipennis Saylor, 1935 i c g b
Data sources: i = ITIS, c = Catalogue of Life, g = GBIF, b = Bugguide.net

References

Further reading

 
 
 
 

Rutelinae
Articles created by Qbugbot